Katie Malliff (born 19 April 2003) is an English professional squash player. As of March 2023, she was ranked number 50 in the world.

Career

In March 2022, she won her first professional tournament at the age of 18 after defeating Marta Dominguez Fernandez 3–1 in the final of the Val de Reuil Normandie, a Challenger 5 level event.

In April 2022, she triumphed in the European Individual U19 tournament defeating Hannah Chukwu 3–0 in the final.

Katie Malliff claimed her first victory of the 2022/23 season in Switzerland defeating Marta Dominguez Fernandez 3-2 in an epic 62 minute final. She continued to make an impact at the Platinum rated Hong Kong Squash Open of that year where she reached the round of 16 ultimately going out to World Number 4  Joelle_King in a close fought encounter.
Malliff continued her excellent form by reaching the final of her very next tournament (The 2023 Colwyn Bay Classic) losing out in yet another close fought encounter with former top 10 player Emily Whitlock.

PSA Challenger 5 Titles (2)

References

2003 births
Living people
English female squash players